Sabine Rückauer (born 13 April 1977) is a German ice hockey player. She competed in the women's tournament at the 2002 Winter Olympics.

References

1977 births
Living people
German women's ice hockey players
Olympic ice hockey players of Germany
Ice hockey players at the 2002 Winter Olympics
Sportspeople from Düsseldorf
21st-century German women